J. Leo Fairbanks (1878-1946) was an American art educator, painter and sculptor. Born in Utah, educated at Brigham Young University and trained in Paris, he headed the art department of the Salt Lake City School District until he joined Oregon State University as the chair of its department of art and architecture in 1923. He designed a sculptural frieze in the Laie Hawaii Temple.

References

1878 births
1946 deaths
People from Payson, Utah
Brigham Young University alumni
Académie Julian alumni
Académie Colarossi alumni
Artists from Utah
American male painters
American male sculptors
20th-century American painters
20th-century American sculptors
20th-century male artists